Urfan Abbasov (born 14 October 1992) is an Azerbaijani professional footballer who plays as a left back for Gabala FK in the Azerbaijan Premier League, and the Azerbaijan national team.

Career

Club
On 4 June 2019, Abbasov left Gabala FK by mutual consent, after playing 220 games for the club, signing for Sabail FK.

On 9 June 2021, Abbasov returned to Gabala, signing a one-year contract.

International
On 10 November 2015 Abbasov was called up to the Azerbaijan national team for their game against Moldova, during which he made his debut coming on as a 69th-minute substitute for Pavlo Pashayev.

Abbasov scored his first goal for Azerbaijan on 29 May 2018, in a Friendly against Kyrgyzstan.

Career statistics

Club

International

Statistics accurate as of match played 10 September 2018

International goals
Scores and results list Azerbaijan's goal tally first.

Honours
Gabala
 Azerbaijan Cup: 2018–19

References

External links
 

1992 births
Living people
Azerbaijani footballers
Azerbaijan under-21 international footballers
Azerbaijan international footballers
Association football defenders
Gabala FC players
Sabail FK players
Azerbaijan Premier League players
Footballers from Baku